is a Japanese politician who currently serves as the Governor of Tokyo since 2016. She graduated from the American University in Cairo in 1976 and was a member of the House of Representatives of Japan from 1993 until 2016, when she resigned to run for Governor of Tokyo. She also previously served as Minister of the Environment in the Junichiro Koizumi cabinet from 2003 to 2006 and briefly as Minister of Defense in the first cabinet of Shinzō Abe in 2007. Koike was elected Governor of Tokyo in 2016, becoming the metropolis's first female Governor. Koike was re-elected Governor in 2020, winning 59.7% of the vote.

Considered one of the most high profile and well known Japanese politicians, Koike has been frequently mentioned as holding Prime Ministerial ambitions. She ran in the 2008 Liberal Democratic Party leadership election, becoming the first woman to run for the leadership of a major Japanese political party, however she came in third place losing to Tarō Asō. In 2017 she left the LDP amid much media attention and launched two parties: the national party Kibō no Tō and the regional party Tomin First no Kai. Kibō no Tō contested the 2017 general election with Koike as leader, however the party underperformed expectations and mostly disappeared after merging with the Democratic Party for the People in 2018. The same year Koike stepped down as leader of Tomin First and officially became independent, however she has still endorsed and campaigned for Tomin First candidates in Tokyo and the party still makes frequent use of her image and policies.

Early life and education
Born and raised in Ashiya, Hyōgo, a wealthy, small, city near Kobe, Koike went to Kōnan Girls' Junior and Senior High School for her secondary education. Her father, Yūjirō Koike, was a foreign trade merchant who handled oil products. He was also involved in politics, supporting Shintarō Ishihara and the Tatenokai in the 1960s, and ran unsuccessfully for national election in 1969. Yūjirō emphasised to Yuriko that it was essential for Japan to strengthen relations with Arab countries to ensure a stable petroleum supply to prevent Japan being thrust into an oil war again in the future. After dropping out of Kwansei Gakuin University's School of Sociology in September 1971, she went on to study Arabic at the American University in Cairo and received a Bachelor of Arts in Sociology as the top student from Cairo University in October 1976. When she was 21, she married a fellow Japanese student but divorced soon after. She began to work as an interpreter of Arabic and later became a journalist, interviewing Muammar Gaddafi and Yasser Arafat in 1978, and becoming a news anchor in 1979. She received the Female Broadcaster of Japan award in 1990.

Career in politics

Koike was elected to the House of Councillors in 1992 as a member of the Japan New Party. She was then elected to the House of Representatives in 1993, representing the Hyogo 2nd district. In 1996, she was re-elected to the House of Representatives, this time representing the Hyogo 6th district for the New Frontier Party. She held this seat in the 2000 election as a candidate of the New Conservative Party. She joined the Liberal Democratic Party in 2002. She also has been a regular contributor to Project Syndicate since 2010.

Cabinet service (2003–2007) 
She served as the Minister of the Environment and Minister of State for Okinawa and Northern Territories Affairs in the Cabinet of Prime Minister Jun'ichirō Koizumi. Along with Satsuki Katayama and Makiko Fujino, Koike became known as one of Koizumi's "assassins" in the 2005 Lower House election, running in Tokyo against an LDP hardliner candidate who opposed Koizumi's policies.

She was appointed the first female Minister of Defense in June 2007 during the first term of Prime Minister Shinzo Abe, but announced in August 2007 that she intended to resign from the post, citing the Aegis classified information leak scandal as a reason. Koike later hinted that the much-publicized fight she had had with Chief Cabinet Secretary Yasuhisa Shiozaki over a vice-minister replacement was the real reason, as the opposition would use that to oppose a bill on Japan's terrorism laws.

2008 LDP leadership election 
On 8 September 2008, she launched her bid to become president of the LDP and became the first woman ever to seek the premiership in Japan's history: "I have received the enthusiastic support of my colleagues. In order to break through the deadlock facing Japanese society, I believe the country might as well have a female candidate. Hillary used the word 'glass ceiling' ... but in Japan, it isn't glass, it's an iron plate. I'm not Mrs. Thatcher, but what is needed is a strategy that advances a cause with conviction, clear policies and sympathy with the people." In the leadership election, held on 22 September, Tarō Asō won with 351 of the 527 votes; Koike placed third with 46 votes.

Governor of Tokyo 
Following the resignation of Tokyo governor Naoki Inose in December 2013, Koike was widely rumored to be a potential candidate for the gubernatorial election expected to be held in February 2014, along with Hideo Higashikokubaru, Hakubun Shimomura, Seiko Hashimoto and Yōichi Masuzoe. She ultimately did not run, and Masuzoe won.

After Masuzoe announced his resignation in June 2016, Koike announced her intention to run in the election for his successor. Koike stated that she would run "as an LDP lawmaker" but did not obtain the approval of the Tokyo LDP chapter before announcing her candidacy. The LDP officially endorsed Hiroya Masuda, and its Tokyo chapter issued a notice that any members supporting Koike would be punished. Nonetheless, several prominent LDP politicians continued to back Koike, while senior leaders such as Shinzo Abe refrained from making speeches in support of either candidate.

Koike was elected Governor of Tokyo on 31 July 2016, becoming the first woman in the post.

On 21 August 2016, at the 2016 Summer Olympics closing ceremony, Koike received the Olympic Flag, via Thomas Bach, from the mayor of Rio de Janeiro, Eduardo Paes.

On 31 May 2017, in advance of the upcoming local elections, Koike resigned from the Liberal Democratic Party and officially became the leader of Tomin First no Kai (Tokyoites First).  Koike founded the group in 2016 in preparation for the elections and formed an alliance with Komeito in an effort to secure a governing majority in Tokyo's parliament. On 3 July 2017, the alliance took a majority in the prefectural election, pushing out the Liberal Democratic Party with a combined 79 seats of the 127-seat assembly.

Koike announced on August 29 that Tokyo will begin implementation of the world’s fastest mobile internet network. Leading the charge is Manabu Miyasaka, the newly appointed counselor to the governor on digital transformation of Tokyo, and former chairman of Yahoo! Japan Corporation.

Koike ran her platform based on seven zeros, which were basically socio-economic problems faced by residents of Tokyo. Out of these goals, she was able to reduce the number of children on the waitlist to get admission in day care and cutting down the number of euthanized dogs and cats. However, critics say other issues like tackling the overwork culture, reducing crowding on rush hour trains, and getting rid of above-ground electricity poles have not yet been achieved.

Political positions 
Koike supports economic liberalism, promotes administrative and budgetary reform, and insists on further advancement of the status of women in the working world. In promising the pursuit of women-friendly policies, she has stated, "I believe that pushing policies for women will be good for Tokyo and bring happiness to the capital." Her stated basic principles and stance regarding political reform are encompassed by "The 5 Cs: Check, Challenge, Change, Creative and Communication". In terms of the economy, she has used for aggressive privatization of Japanese assets to diminish the government's debt burden. A strong turn towards IT development, natural sciences, sustainable infrastructure, and efficiency-based administrative reforms for public services were also on the docket. She is also one of the main figures in Japan's right-wing populist camp. She is also sometimes referred to as "ultraconservative".

Environmentalism 
Having learned an environmental way of life from her own experience of wartime austerities in Egypt, Koike addresses environmental issues. She expressed the idea of introducing a carbon tax in 2005 so that Japan might achieve the goals of the Kyoto Protocol. The next year, she inaugurated the "Mottainai Furoshiki" campaign, which urges shoppers to use furoshiki in place of plastic shopping bags. She is against the use of biofuels made from food crops.

Conservative nationalism 
As a conservative nationalist, Koike was one of the five vice secretaries general of the Diet Members' Committee of Nippon Kaigi, the country's largest conservative think tank and the main nationalist lobby, once chaired by Tarō Asō. She is also known to have powerful ties to other large conservative political groups.

Koike's possible affiliation with a far-right group was questioned in 2016, when a reporter asked about her speaking at a conference hosted by Soyokaze, a women's non-profit with purported ties to far-right group Zaitokukai, which had a history of hate speech. In response, Koike stated that she wasn't aware of the non-profit's ties to Zaitokukai, and that she is invited to speak at many events.

Position on Article 9 
Her foreign and security policies are often regarded as hawkish. She suggested that the prime minister revise the interpretation of Article 9 of the Constitution of Japan to enable the government to exercise the right to collective self-defense.

She has supported the United States and the War on Terror and opposes the Japanese government's tradition of UN-centered foreign policy. However, she has sent mixed messages to the United States in terms of destabilizing the Middle East with democratization efforts. On the other hand, showing parts of the world how powerful the United States is as an ally is a priority. During the 2008 LDP leadership election, she pledged to make Russia return the four disputed islands to Japan if she was elected as prime minister. Overall, Koike is a diplomatic leader. Back in 2010, she helped strengthen ties between Libya's Muammar Gaddafi and Japan. This led to the creation of the Japan-Libya Friendship Association.

Other positions 
Koike has also actively promoted Japanese pop culture, appearing in cosplay as Sally from Sally the Witch in 2015, and stating during her 2016 Tokyo gubernatorial campaign that she wanted to turn all of Tokyo into an "anime land".

Koike initiated "Jisa Biz" (時差biz) in July 2017 to promote remote work and staggered work times to reduce traffic congestion during the morning rush hour in Tokyo.

In 2017, Koike launched and led a new national political party. It was called Kibō no Tō, which means "Party of Hope". Although still Governor of Tokyo, she was the primary leader of this party. It was assumed that this party could have been the main opposition to the LDP. On 22 October 2017, the Party of Hope did not perform as well at the polls as expected. Koike's overarching policies were similar to those of Prime Minister Shinzo Abe. The policy to set them apart was their differing opinions on nuclear energy. Koike was opposed to it as an advocate of the environment. Koike did not join any successor party to the Party of Hope at its April 2018 dissolution.

References

External links 
 Koike Yuriko Official Website
 Prime Minister of Japan and His Cabinet – Profile
 Yuriko Koike appointed new Defense Minister

|-

|-

|-

|-

|-

|-

|-

|-

1952 births
20th-century Japanese politicians
20th-century Japanese women politicians
21st-century Japanese politicians
21st-century Japanese women politicians
The American University in Cairo alumni
Cairo University alumni
Conservatism in Japan
Environment ministers of Japan
Female defence ministers
Women government ministers of Japan
Female Japanese governors
Female members of the House of Councillors (Japan)
Female members of the House of Representatives (Japan)
Governors of Tokyo
Japan New Party politicians
Japanese anti-communists
Japanese defense ministers
Japanese nationalists
Japanese television personalities
Kwansei Gakuin University alumni
Liberal Democratic Party (Japan) politicians
Liberal Party (Japan, 1998) politicians
Living people
Members of Nippon Kaigi
Members of the House of Councillors (Japan)
Members of the House of Representatives (Japan)
New Conservative Party (Japan) politicians
New Frontier Party (Japan) politicians
Recipients of the Olympic Order
Recipients of the Paralympic Order
Right-wing populism in Japan
Zaitokukai
Politicians from Hyōgo Prefecture
Anti-Korean sentiment in Japan
Asia Game Changer Award winners
Historical negationism